Captain Philip Thicknesse (1719 – 23 November 1792) was an English author, eccentric, and friend of the artist Thomas Gainsborough. He wrote several travel guides.

Early life
Philip Thicknesse was born in Staffordshire, England, son of John Thicknesse, Rector of Farthinghoe, Northamptonshire, and Joyce (née Blencowe) Thicknesse. He was brought up in Farthinghoe.

Career
Thicknesse visited the Colony of Georgia in September 1736, but returned to England in 1737, claiming to be the first of the emigrants to return. He obtained a commission as a Captain of an independent company in Jamaica after 1737. On an expedition against Jamaican Maroons in the Blue Mountains, he wrote of encounters with Windward Maroon leaders Quao and Queen Nanny. He transferred to a marine regiment as a Captain-Lieutenant in 1740. He was later Lieutenant-Governor of Landguard Fort, Suffolk (1753–1766).

Thicknesse was a friend of the society artist Thomas Gainsborough, whom he met in about 1753, and of his less well-known brother, the inventor Humphrey Gainsborough. As an author he wrote for The Gentleman's Magazine. He also published The Speaking Figure and the Automaton Chess Player, Exposed and Detected, a none-too-accurate exposé of a chess-playing machine, The Turk.

In 1742, Thicknesse eloped with Maria Lanove, a wealthy heiress, whom he abducted from a street in Southampton. They moved to Bath, taking advantage of the social whirl. In 1749 Maria and his children (by then three) contracted diphtheria. She and two children died, leaving a daughter, Anna. When Maria's parents died some time later (his mother-in-law committing suicide), he spent much time trying to claim their fortune. Thicknesse then married Lady Elizabeth Tuchet, daughter of James Tuchet, 6th Earl of Castlehaven, and Hon. Elizabeth Arundell, on 10 May 1749. They had a son George (1758–1818), later 19th Baron Audley. Elizabeth died in childbirth in 1762.

His third wife was his late wife's companion, Anne Ford (1732–1824), daughter of Thomas Ford, whom he married on 27 September 1762. She was a gifted, well-educated musician with a beautiful voice and knew five languages. She gave Sunday concerts at her father's house, but her ambition was to become a professional actress, and despite fatherly disapproval, left home to go on the stage. She and Thicknesse had a son, Captain John Thicknesse. RN (c. 1763–1846). The couple spent time travelling in Europe. In later life he lived in the Royal Crescent, Bath, in a house he then let out and sold. He moved to another, St Catherine's Hermitage, and landscaped the grounds to create a "hermit's cell" for himself.

Death and will
Thicknesse died on a journey near Boulogne, Pas-de-Calais, France, and was buried there. In his later life he had become an "ornamental hermit". His will stipulated that his right hand be cut off and delivered to his son, George, who was inattentive, "to remind him of his duty to God after having so long abandoned the duty he owed to a father, who once so affectionately loved him."

Books
1768: Useful Hints to those who Make the Tour of France. This gains a mention from a character in Tobias Smollett's epistolary novel The Expedition of Humphry Clinker.
1772: A Treatise on the Art of Decyphering, And of Writing in Cyphers,With An Harmonic Alphabet
1777: A Year's Journey through France and Part of Spain. 2 vols. Bath: printed by R. Cruttwell, for the author; and sold by Wm. Brown, London
1778: The New Prose Bath Guide : for the year 1778. [London?]: Printed for the author and sold by Dodsley
1786: A Year's Journey Through The Pais Bas: or, Austrian Netherlands. London, printed for J. Debrett
1788: Memoirs and Anecdotes of Philip Thicknesse, Late Lieutenant-Governor of Land Guard Fort, and unfortunately Father to George Touchet, Baron Audley. Printed for the Author, MDCCLXXXVIII. [1788]. A third volume followed in 1791.
He also contributed to 'A View of the Poorhouse of Datchworth in Herts Addressed to the Overseers of England

References

External links

Biography
Pictures in the National Portrait Gallery, London
Manybooks.net entry
Portrait of his wife nee Ann Ford

1719 births
1792 deaths
People from Staffordshire
English essayists
English travel writers
British colonial army officers
Royal Marines officers